Ramakrishnaiella is a genus of thrips in the family Phlaeothripidae.

Species
 Ramakrishnaiella nirmalapaksha
 Ramakrishnaiella unispina

References

Phlaeothripidae
Thrips
Thrips genera